Margery (Margaret) le Despenser, de jure suo jure 3rd Baroness le Despenser (1387 creation), was the daughter and heiress of Philip le Despenser, 2nd Baron le Despenser. She was born about 1397 in Nettlestead, Suffolk, England, and married John de Ros, 7th Baron de Ros. He died without heirs, and she married secondly Roger Wentworth of Nettlestead, Esq. (d.1452), son of John Wentworth of North Elmsall.

Issue
 Sir Philip Wentworth, married Mary Clifford, daughter of John Clifford, 7th Baron de Clifford and Lady Elizabeth Percy. His son, Henry Wentworth, was the maternal grandfather to Jane Seymour, third consort of King Henry VIII, and ancestor to the Barons Wentworth. They are also ancestors to Meghan, Duchess of Sussex.
 Henry Wentworth of Codham Hall, married firstly to Elizabeth Howard, daughter of Henry Howard of Teringhampton; and secondly to Joan FitzSymonds, daughter of Robert FitzSymonds. He had issue by both wives.
 Agnes Wentworth, married Sir Robert Constable; they had six sons which included Sir Marmaduke Constable and seven daughters including Agnes Constable, wife of Sir William Tyrwhitt.
 Margaret Wentworth, married Sir William Hopton and had issue.
 Anne Wentworth, married John Calthorpe.

References

 Cracrofts Peerage. Baron le Despenser [E, 1387]

1397 births
Year of death missing
Daughters of barons
English baronesses
Barons le Despencer